Persiakaran is a 2014 Indian Malayalam-language film directed by Asok R Nath, starring Adil Ibrahim, Sudhakshina, Mukesh, Praveen Ram, Juby Ninan,Rishi Prakash and Kochu Preman.

The film introduced close to 40 newcomers like Adithya Hari and Juby Ninan including the lead pair.

Summary

Persiakaran filmed the life, hardships and troubles faced by the people who reach Middle East seeking a better life and the success and failure of the same who attempt to be the best.the producer is hari chakkalil.

Cast

Adil Ibrahim
Sudhakshina
Mukesh
Praveen Ram
Dinesh Paniker
Juby Ninan
Rishi Prakash
Moideen Koya
Kochu Preman
Adithya Hari

Reception
Now running rated the film with 1.5/5 stars stating the film as a " a mopey affair that gets increasingly frustrating with every passing moment." They concluded saying that the film lack individuality and falls short on insight that leaves the viewer unconvinced.

References

External links
 

2010s Malayalam-language films
2014 films
Films shot in Dubai